In commutative algebra, Krull's principal ideal theorem, named after Wolfgang Krull (1899–1971),  gives a bound on the height of a principal ideal in a commutative Noetherian ring.  The theorem is sometimes referred to by its German name, Krulls Hauptidealsatz (Satz meaning "proposition" or "theorem").

Precisely, if R is a Noetherian ring and I is a principal, proper ideal of R, then each minimal prime ideal over I has height at most one.

This theorem can be generalized to ideals that are not principal, and the result is often called Krull's height theorem.  This says that if R is a Noetherian ring and I is a proper ideal generated by n elements of R, then each minimal prime over I has height at most n. The converse is also true: if a prime ideal has height n, then it is a minimal prime ideal over an ideal generated by n elements.

The principal ideal theorem and the generalization, the height theorem, both follow from the fundamental theorem of dimension theory in commutative algebra (see also below for the direct proofs). Bourbaki's Commutative Algebra gives a direct proof. Kaplansky's Commutative Rings includes a proof due to David Rees.

Proofs

Proof of the principal ideal theorem 
Let  be a Noetherian ring, x an element of it and  a minimal prime over x. Replacing A by the localization , we can assume  is local with the maximal ideal . It forms a descending chain of ideals . Thus, there is the descending chain of ideals  in the ring . Now, the radical  is the intersection of all minimal prime ideals containing ;  is among them. But  is a unique maximal ideal and thus . Since  contains some power of its radical, it follows that  is an Artinian ring and thus the chain  stabilizes and so there is some n such that . It implies:
,

Now, quotienting out both sides by     yields . Then, by Nakayama's lemma (which says a finitely generated module M is zero if  for some ideal I contained in the radical), we get ; i.e.,  and thus .

Proof of the height theorem 
Krull’s height theorem can be proved as a consequence of the principal ideal theorem by induction on the number of elements. Replacing  by the localization  we can assume  is a local ring; note we then have .

Now we consider the ring  and the corresponding chain  in it. By inductive hypothesis,  and thus .

References

 
 , see in particular section (12.I), p. 77
http://www.math.lsa.umich.edu/~hochster/615W10/supDim.pdf

Commutative algebra
Ideals (ring theory)
Theorems in ring theory